Geovanni de Jesus (born June 30, 1979) is a marathon runner from Brazil, who twice won the Buenos Aires Marathon in Argentina (2005 and 2006).

Achievements
All results regarding marathon, unless stated otherwise

References
 ARRS

1979 births
Living people
Brazilian male long-distance runners
Place of birth missing (living people)
Brazilian male marathon runners
20th-century Brazilian people
21st-century Brazilian people